The Pearl Theatre was a theatre in Philadelphia. Opened in 1927 with 1400 seats, it was a notable jazz and dance venue and had a glamorous reputation among the rich and famous. In 1931, the Nicholas Brothers played here. Duke Ellington, John Coltrane, and many other prominent jazz ensembles of the period performed here. Bennie Moten and the Kansas City Stompers's featuring Count Basie on piano performed at the club in November 1931, and in December 1932  the audience raved all week about their "Moten Swing"; the doors of the theatre were let open to the public who came crammed into the theatre to hear the new sound, demanding seven encores on one night. Pearl Bailey was discovered at the theatre, where she entered and won the theatre's amateur song and dance contest and was to be paid $35 a week to perform there for two weeks, however, the theatre closed during her engagement and she was never paid.

The Pearl Theatre closed in 1963 and was demolished after 1970.

Modern cinema
Another Pearl Theatre on 1600 N Broad Street, Philadelphia, which functioned as a modern cinema complex, closed in August, 2016. It was reopened a few years ago as the AMC Broadstreet 7.

References

External links
Cinema Treasures: Pearl Theatre

Theatres in Philadelphia
Jazz clubs in Philadelphia
Templetown, Philadelphia
Defunct jazz clubs in the United States